Sprengbagger 1010 (which translates roughly as: Explodigger 1010 or Explosives Excavator 1010) is a 1929 German silent film directed by Carl Ludwig Achaz-Duisberg and starring Heinrich George, Viola Garden and Ivan Koval-Samborsky.

The film's sets were designed by the art director Andrej Andrejew.

Cast
 Heinrich George as Direktor March  
 Viola Garden as Olga Lossen  
 Ivan Koval-Samborsky as Ingenieur Karl Hartmann  
 Ilse Stobrawa as Camilla von Einerm  
 Gertrud Arnold as Die alte Hartmann  
 Paul Biensfeldt as Inspektor Bachmann  
 Paul Henckels as Gemeindevorsteher  
 Ilse Vigdor as Zofe

References

Bibliography
 Alpi, Deborah Lazaroff. Robert Siodmak: A Biography, with Critical Analyses of His Films Noirs and a Filmography of All His Works. McFarland, 1998.

External links

1929 films
Films of the Weimar Republic
German silent feature films
Terra Film films
German black-and-white films